A Journey of Happiness is a 2019 Malaysian-Hong Kong Cantonese-language comedy film that was produced by Sunstrong Entertainment & Lomo Pictures. The films tells the journey of a dysfunctional Hong Kong family of four who self-travels in Malaysia for vacation.

It is released on 5 February 2019 in Malaysia and Hong Kong, and its Mandarin dubbed version was released on 31 January in Singapore.

Synopsis 
The Siew family consists of father Siew Fatt (Lo Hoi-pang), who is depressed after his wife passed away, eldest son Siew Beng (Jerry Lamb), a property agent; only daughter Siew Shen (Joyce Cheng), a loud optimistic tour guide; and youngest son Siew Lup (Alex Lam), a social media influencer wannabe. Siew Shen decides to takes her family on a trip to Malaysia, hoping to fix the family's strained relationship. Along the journey, they encounter many people, endless catastrophes and fun surprises. How will their journey end?

Cast 
Joyce Cheng as Siew Shen, daughter
Lo Hoi-pang as Siew Fatt, father
Alex Lam as Siew Lup, younger son
Jerry Lamb as Siew Beng, elder son
Ah Niu as Cui Fong
Lin Min-Chen as Pumpkin BB
Siu Yam-yam as Orchid
Cheng Kam Cheong
Mimi Chu
Hay Wong
Miss Hunny/Hunny Ho

References

External links 
 
  A Journey of Happiness on Cinema.com.my

2019 films
Malaysian comedy films